The Congregation is an album by American tenor saxophonist Johnny Griffin, recorded in 1957 and released on the Blue Note label. It was his last recording for the label. The cover art was designed by Andy Warhol and Reid Miles.

Reception

The AllMusic review by Scott Yanow awarded the album 5 stars and stated: "The great tenor saxophonist Johnny Griffin is heard in top form on this near-classic quartet set... It's recommended for bop collectors."

Track listing
All compositions by Johnny Griffin, except as indicated.
 "The Congregation" - 6:47
 "Latin Quarter" (John Jenkins) - 6:29
 "I'm Glad There Is You" (Jimmy Dorsey, Paul Mertz) - 5:10
 "Main Spring" - 6:33
 "It's You or No One" (Sammy Cahn, Jule Styne) - 4:52

Bonus track on 1994 Blue Note CD reissue:
 "I Remember You" (Johnny Mercer, Victor Schertzinger) - 7:29

Personnel
Johnny Griffin - tenor saxophone
Sonny Clark - piano
Paul Chambers - bass
Kenny Dennis - drums

References 

1958 albums
Blue Note Records albums
Johnny Griffin albums
Albums produced by Alfred Lion
Albums recorded at Van Gelder Studio
Albums with cover art by Andy Warhol